Thalloloma is a genus of lichens in the family Graphidaceae. It contains 20 species.

Species
Thalloloma astroideum 
Thalloloma buriticum 
Thalloloma castanocarpum 
Thalloloma cinnabarinum 
Thalloloma deplanatum 
Thalloloma haemographum 
Thalloloma halonatum 
Thalloloma isidiosum 
Thalloloma janeirense 
Thalloloma microsporum 
Thalloloma nitidum 
Thalloloma ochroleucum  – China
Thalloloma patulum 
Thalloloma pedespulli 
Thalloloma pontalense 
Thalloloma rhodastrum 
Thalloloma rubromarginatum 
Thalloloma scribillans 
Thalloloma subvelata

References

Ostropales genera
Graphidaceae
Lichen genera
Taxa named by Vittore Benedetto Antonio Trevisan de Saint-Léon
Taxa described in 1853